Captain The Honourable Seymour Fitzroy Ormsby-Gore, FRGS (18 January 1863 – 10 November 1950) was a British Conservative politician.

Biography
Ormsby-Gore was the youngest son of William Ormsby-Gore, 2nd Baron Harlech (1819–1904) by his wife Lady Emily Charlotte Seymour (died 1892), daughter of Admiral Sir George Francis Seymour and sister of Francis Hugh George Seymour, 5th Marquess of Hertford. His father also served as a Conservative politician, and inherited the barony of Harlech from his brother in 1882, when his children received the style the Honourable.

He graduated from the University of Oxford and was commissioned a lieutenant in the 4th (Militia) Battalion of the Oxfordshire Light Infantry in 1885, serving as such until 1889. In February 1900 he was appointed a captain in the 3rd Kent Artillery Volunteers.

He was elected a Member of Parliament for Gainsborough in 1900, serving as such until 1906 when he resigned.

He died unmarried in 1950 aged 87.

References

External links 
 

1863 births
1950 deaths
Conservative Party (UK) MPs for English constituencies
UK MPs 1900–1906
Younger sons of barons